Quezada is a Spanish surname. Notable people with the surname include:

Alejandro Quezada (born 1975), Dominican baseball player
Ana Quezada, American politician
Benigno Quezada Naranjo (born 1962), Mexican politician 
Benjamín Medrano Quezada (born 1966), Mexican politician
Federico Ortiz Quezada (born 1935), Mexican physician
Humberto Andrade Quezada (born 1955), Mexican politician
Josefina Quezada (circa 1925-2012), Mexican artist
Juan Quezada Celado (born 1940), Mexican potter 
Manny Quezada (born 1985), Brazilian basketball player
Manuel Quezada (born 1977), American boxer
Martín Quezada (born 1978), American politician
Milly Quezada (born 1955), Dominican singer
Nathalie Quezada (born 1989), Chilean football player
Rodolfo Quezada Toruño (1932–2012), Guatemalan cardinal
Roberto A. Quezada (born 1959), American filmmaker
Steven Michael Quezada (born 1963), American actor
Yuniesky Quezada (born 1984), Cuban chess player

See also
Quesada (disambiguation)

Surnames
Spanish-language surnames
Surnames of Spanish origin